Via deep water aeration or hypolimnetic aeration, the oxygen demand of deep water is provided by oxygen from the atmosphere without destroying the lake’s natural stratification. Thus the deep water becomes aerobic, the dissolving of phosphates is reduced significantly and the production of ammonia by sediments improves.
Scientific evidence shows that it is possible to keep the deep water clean through this process all year round via technical ventilation measures and thereby to recover the natural balance of lakes effectively.

Eutrophication 

In stratified, eutrophic lakes an oxygen deficit in deep water is created during summer stagnation. As a result of elevated nutrient inputs, the trophic level of many lakes increases continuously. Elevated phosphorus concentrations may lead to stronger algae growth and a corresponding increase in oxygen consumption in the deep zones. 
In the anaerobic environment of deep water sludge accumulates, while concentrations of ammonium, iron, manganese and toxic hydrogen sulfide increase in the water body.
The hypolimnion is now not only hostile, but the anaerobic conditions also cause increased phosphate dissolutions from the sediments into the deep water. These additional nutrient loads create further problems after the next full circulation. 
Particularly in terms of drinking water production in reservoirs and dams with respect to the existing regulations of the Drinking Water Ordinance, these deteriorations in water status are a serious problem. The deep water aeration can prevent this process.

Technical measures for hypolimnetic aeration 
TIBEAN or TWBA stands for the German Tiefenwasserbelüftungsanlage which means "deep water aeration system". 
The TIBEAN series are floating or submersible plants. They consist of one or more upstream pipes, where the water is aerated while rising up, a degassing chamber where the aerated water is freed of gases and one or more downstream pipes where the vented, degassed water is pumped back into the hypolimnion. In the degassing chamber, additional nutrient absorbers and/ or nutrient precipitation devices can be implemented.

Technology 
At the lower end of the plant atmospheric air is inserted into the water by an ejector. A mixture of water and oxygen is forced upwards in the upstream pipe. At the end of the upstream pipe the mixture flows into the degassing chamber. In the degassing chamber, residual gases are separated from the oxygenated water. The gas escapes into the atmosphere, the oxygenated water flows back through the downstream pipe. The outlet provides a laminar flow and a horizontal outflow into the hypolimnion.
Thanks to the flow and mass transfer calculations which are performed in the context of the technical configuration, the optimal set-up can be determined.

Individual parts 
 Floating tanks
 Upstream pipe (Telescope) 
 Degassing chamber
 Mixing device
 Suction fence 
 Covering fence
 Downstream pipe
 Oxygen input
 Submersible pump with ejector
 Main ballast tanks

Material 
TIBEAN can be made of polyethylene, polypropylene, stainless steel and an aluminium-manganese alloy.

Applications 
TIBEAN systems are highly variable and cover a very wide range of applications with an oxygen input from 1.5 to 60 kg/h, an application depth of 5 to 50 m, and a flow rate from 600 to 7500 m3/h.

The objectives for water-body restoration or aquatic therapy can vary, depending on the priority. Therefore, the possibilities of deep water aeration systems as TIBEAN are diverse:
 Conservation of deep zones as aerobic habitat for fish and other higher organisms.
 Reduction of nutrient concentration in surface waters.
 Prevention of sludge formation, increased ammonium production and the formation of toxic hydrogen sulfide.
 Cost reduction for drinking water production.
 Targeted treatment of deep water with coagulants.

Drinking water production in water reservoir dams 
Especially in respect of drinking water production, deep-water aeration allows a significant reduction of production costs and facilitates further technical treatment of the hypolimnetic water. Since water for drinking water production is drawn from below the thermocline in most reservoirs, an improved hypolimnetic water quality has direct influence on the production of drinking water. With regard to the applicable limiting values of drinking water regulations, the following effects can be achieved via deep-water aeration:

pH and corrosion 
For the pH of drinking water, the threshold value is 6.5–9.5. pH values outside the neutral range (pH 6.5–7.5) are principally critical, since they provide an indication of the corrosion behaviour of water. Slightly acidic water (pH 4–6.5) usually corrodes galvanized iron pipes, but also copper and asbestos cement pipes. This process is known as acid corrosion. Practical experience has shown that the use of unprotected steel pipes is only possible at neutral pH values. By lower pH values, the removal of the pure zinc layer is promoted. As a result of the dissolved salts and gases, natural cold waters usually show a slightly alkaline reaction. These properties are created by setting the equilibrium concentrations of dissolved carbon dioxide in the form of bicarbonate ions and carbonate ions. Higher alkaline pH values (pH 9–14) in the presence of oxygen as an oxidant lead to so-called oxygen corrosion. To avoid the described acid or oxygen corrosion, buffer solutions are added to the raw water for drinking water production. By the pH-stabilizing effect of hypolimnetic aeration, the application of these buffer solutions can be reduced, thus reducing operating costs.

Iron and manganese 
For concentrations of iron and manganese in drinking water, the threshold values are 200 µg/L and 50 µg/L respectively. Although they serve as essential trace elements in drinking water, slightly elevated iron and manganese concentrations are undesirable from a technical and hygienic point of view. At low oxygen concentrations, iron and manganese are dissolved as ions. The naturally occurring iron and manganese is mainly present as divalent, soluble ferrous or manganese compound. At very high concentrations, a yellow water colour is noticeable. When this water is aerated, the oxidation creates ferric iron/ manganese, with iron forming red-brown and manganese forming black precipitates. These precipitates cause staining and turbidity of the water and lead to laundry stains. The precipitates can also narrow pipes and deposit on mountings. Iron levels above 0.3 mg/L and manganese levels above 0.5 mg/L become noticeable as an unpleasant metallic taste. Providing an aerobic hypolimnetic environment, deep-water aeration oxidizes and precipitates dissolved iron and manganese compounds, before the water is treated in a suitable facility for drinking water production. In this way further operating costs for the removal of dissolved iron and manganese compounds can be realized.

The amount and mobility of iron species also influences the redox-controlled phosphorus household. Divalent iron compounds successively diffusing from anaerobic sediment layers are oxidized at the boundary zone between aerobic water and anaerobic sediment, and accumulate at the top sediment layer. The stronger this accumulation, the more effective the aerobic boundary between sediment and water can act as a diffusion barrier for phosphate.

Nutrient concentrations and sludge formation 
As already mentioned, the deep-water aeration can reduce nutrient concentrations significantly. Aerobic conditions promote nitrification and subsequent denitrification thus contributing to nitrogen discharge of the system. The chemical and microbial oxidation of reduced substances such as hydrogen sulfide and methane as well as the intensified degradation of organic matter can reduce the sludge formation. Aerobic conditions in the deep-water are also an important factor to decrease the redox-controlled redissolution of phosphorus from the sediment and to allow reprecipitation of released phosphorus. In this way the deep-water aeration additionally reduces costs for drinking water production by waiving denitrification stages or reducing the use of costly flocculants.

Planning and design 
The final design of plants is carried out in different phases. The first step should always be a morphometric measurement of the water body in order to assess the depth profile and the associated requirements for the technical design, and later on to determine the optimal location of the plant.
The exact technical design requires the evaluation of various measurements of parameters such as nutrient concentrations, temperature stratification, pH, temporal variations of oxygen concentrations as well as calculations of flow rates, mass transport quantities and distribution of suspended solids in the hypolimnion.

Examples 

 Lake Hodges (San Diego, California)
 Lake Marston (Littleton, Colorado)
 Talsperre Schönbrunn (Kreis Hildburghausen, Thuringia)
 Lake Muggesfeld (Segeberg, Schleswig-Holstein)
 Lake Krupund (Pinneberg, Schleswig-Holstein)
 Flensburg Port (Flensburg, Schleswig-Holstein)
 boat harbor Kiel (Kiel, Schleswig-Holstein)
 Eichbaumsee (Hamburg, Hamburg)
 Lake Sodenmatt (Bremen, Bremen)
 Lake Glambeck (Neustrelitz, Mecklenburg-Western Pomerania)
 Schlesersee (Carpin, Mecklenburg-Western Pomerania)
 Schmaler Luzin (Feldberg, Mecklenburg-Western Pomerania)
 Lake Achim (Winsen, Lower Saxony)
 Lake Sacrow (Potsdam, Brandenburg)
 Lake Poviest (Warthe, Brandenburg)
 Aabach Dam (Paderborn, Nordrhein Westfalen)
 Heilenbeck Dam (Ennepetal, North Rhine-Westphalia)
 Lake Fuehling (Köln, North Rhine-Westphalia)
 Wahnbach Dam (Siegburg, North Rhine-Westphalia)
 Swimming lake Bensheim (Bensheim, Hesse)
 Swimming lake Gernsheim (Gernsheim, Hesse)
 Auensee (Leipzig, Saxony)
 Lake Runstedt (Braunsbedra, Saxony)
 Bleilochtalsperre (Saale-Orla-Kreis, Thuringia)
 Lake Heide (Forst, Baden-Württemberg)
 Lake Wald (Forst, Baden-Württemberg)
 Open air pool Walldorf (Walldorf, Baden-Württemberg)
 Lake Steinbrunn (Steinbrunn, Austria)
 Brennsee (Villach, Austria)
 Kahrteich (Vienna, Austria)
 Tilgteich (Vienna, Austria)
 Lake Esterhazy (Eisenstadt, Austria)
 Lake Watzelsdorf (Watzelsdorf, Austria)
 Lago di Terlago (Trient, Italy)
 Lazberc Dam (Bánhorváti, Hungary)
 Lagoa das Furnas (Furnas, Portugal)

References

Aquatic ecology